The Block is a British reality television show that aired on ITV from 3 August to 21 September 2004, based on the Australian series of the same name. The show is presented by Lisa Rogers with Nicholas Cowell judging the properties. The show also had a sister show on ITV2 hosted by Matt Brown.

Format
The show followed 4 couples renovating four identical apartments in Brighton, with each couple given a budget of £25,000 to do so. They had to live in the apartments while continuing their daily lives.

Each week the couples are required to complete renovating a room in their apartment. At the end of each week's episode the room was judged by property expert Nicholas Cowell (brother of Simon Cowell) and the best couple won a prize (either furniture or building materials).

External links

British television series based on Australian television series
2004 British television series debuts
2004 British television series endings
2000s British reality television series
2000s British game shows
ITV (TV network) original programming
Television series by Banijay
Television shows set in Brighton